A Few Acres of Snow is a board game designed by Martin Wallace. It is based on the French and Indian War of 1754-1763. Its name is taken from "a few acres of snow", words of consolation Voltaire provided King Louis XV of France, when news arrived that France had lost Canada. The title was also used for a book by Robert Leckie.

Awards
 2011 winner of the BoardGameGeek Golden Geek Award
 2011 winner of the Meeples' Choice Award,

Reimplementation
In 2014 Treefrog released Mythotopia, a multiplayer game based on the core mechanisms in A Few Acres of Snow. A third, space themed game, A Handful of Stars, was released – as the last game published by Treefrog Games – in 2017.

References

External links

Board games introduced in 2011
Board games about history
Martin Wallace (game designer) games